The Bootleg Series Vol. 15: Travelin' Thru, 1967–1969 is a compilation album by American singer-songwriter Bob Dylan. The 13th installment in the ongoing Bob Dylan Bootleg Series, it was released by Legacy Records on November 1, 2019. The compilation focuses on recordings Dylan made between October 1967 and May 1970 for his albums John Wesley Harding and Nashville Skyline, and appearances on The Johnny Cash Show and special Earl Scruggs: His Family and Friends.

Track listing 
All tracks written by Bob Dylan, except where noted.

A one-disc sampler was also released on the same day consisting of a select number of performances from the three-disc set.

Charts

References 

2019 compilation albums
Bob Dylan compilation albums
Columbia Records compilation albums